Slovenská Ľupča is the largest village in the Banská Bystrica District of central Slovakia.

Geography
The altitude of Slovenská Ľupča ranges from 370 to 699 metres, with the centre of the village lying at 378 metres. The municipality covers an area of 33.325 km². It is situated about 10 km east of Banská Bystrica, in the Hron river valley. Slovenská Ľupča is part of two administrative units, the Banská Bystrica District and the Banská Bystrica Region.

History
In historical records the village was first mentioned in 1250. It was founded on an ancient trade route Via Magna connecting Buda to Kraków. The settlement was built around two important political and social centers: a castle and a monastery. A favorite residence of the influential noble Magister Donč, Slovenská Ľupča was elevated to a town by Charles I in 1340. Slovenská Ľupča lost its town charter in the 19th century. The development of the village in the 20th century was connected with the large pharmaceutical factory Biotika built in 1953.

Ľupča Castle

Ľupča Castle was built in the Middle Ages to protect an important trade route along the Hron river. It was a favorite hunting resort of King Béla IV, who signed the royal town privileges of Banská Bystrica in the castle in 1255. Other monarchs who frequently resided in the castle were King Charles I, King Louis the Great, Emperor Sigismund, and King Matthias Corvinus. The castle hosted an orphanage from 1873 to 1938.

Other landmarks
Kláštorisko is an open-air museum with ruins of a medieval monastery. We do not know when the monastery was founded, but it certainly existed by 1263. Its great supporter Magister Donč was interred there in the 14th century. The monastery was abandoned in the 17th century.

The Holy Trinity The Church of the Most Holy Trinity, three-lane Gothic building with a polygonal ended presbytery and a tower forming part of the mass of the church from the period after 1370. It is situated in a fenced area in the middle of the village. The church underwent a late-Gothic reconstruction in 1470, when the presbytery was newly rebuilt by a vaulted vault. From the Gothic details, windows with stone treads, a cross vault with ornate consoles and studs, and a non-gothic pastorphony were preserved in the church. Another significant adaptation was made in 1575 for Paul Rubigall, who adapted the church to a Renaissance triple. Around the year 1618 the annexation of the Tribell funeral chapel was built on the north side of the church. The church remained for almost two hundred years during the Reformation
A "plague column" (Slovak: Morový stĺp) was erected in the 18th century in thanksgiving to the Virgin Mary for ending a deadly outbreak of plague. It is located in front of the Lutheran church.

Economy

A pharmaceutical factory Biotika is located near the village.

Grand Power s.r.o. is a firearms manufacturer located nearby known for developing the Grand Power K100.

Demographics
Slovenská Ľupča has a population of 3,221 (as of 31 December 2013). According to the 2001 census, 97.7% of inhabitants were Slovaks and 1.3% Romani. The religious makeup was 58.6% Roman Catholics, 20.6% Lutherans, and 11.3% people with no religious affiliation.

Famous people
 Ferenc Wesselényi (1605–1667), count, palatine of Hungary
 Emil Belluš (1899–1979), architect

Partner towns
  Partizánska Ľupča, Slovakia
  Neuhofen an der Ybbs, Austria
  Široké, Slovakia
  Vlčany, Slovakia

References

External links
Municipal website 

Villages and municipalities in Banská Bystrica District